African blues may refer to:

 African blues, a loose term for the West African genre related to the blues of North America
  African Blues (Ali Farka Touré album), a 1988 album by Ali Farka Touré
  African Blues (compilation album), a 1998 album produced by the World Music Network